This is a list of events held by the Cage Rage Championships, a now-defunct mixed martial arts organization that was based in England. The first event, Cage Rage 1, took place on September 7, 2002 and the last, Cage Rage UK - Fighting Hurts Final, on November 1, 2008.

External links
 Cage Rage Results at Sherdog.com

Cage Rage